

Acrobat

Reader Touch

1.0

Originally called Adobe Reader For Windows Tablets (Version 1.0) was released on the Microsoft Windows Store on the second week of December 2012, based on the Adobe Reader Mobile engine found in the iOS, Android, Blackberry and Windows phone versions, is the first application written by Adobe Systems for the Windows 8/RT Metro Style interface. The current versions offers only basic PDF reading features, subsequent patches will bring more complex features to catch up with the more feature complete iOS and Android versions. Adobe Reader for Windows Tablets supports both ARM and Intel x86/x86_64 architectures and can be used both via touch and more classic keyboard+mouse combination.
The main features are:
 Windows 8 Native App and UI
 Semantic Zoom to jump between pages
 Bookmarks and search feature
 Opening password protected PDF
 Select and Copy text

On February 1, 2013, Adobe Reader for Windows Tablet has been officially renamed to Adobe Reader Touch to tell Hybrid Desktop Windows 8 Users which version of Adobe Reader may have (Modern UI or Desktop Version). Name change apart, the changes include:
 Easier Document Navigation With Mouse and Keyboard ([+] and [-] Zoom Buttons)
 View Sticky Notes

1.1
Version 1.1 was released on April 11, 2013. The changes include:
 Printing
 Keyboard shortcuts for Find, Open, Print and Close

1.2
Version 1.2 was released on June 27, 2013. This update adds:
 Go To Page for quicker navigation
 Notes to your document
 Highlight, Strikeout and Underline with Selection and Markup Tool to text
 View Notes attached to text markup
 Save and Save As functionality

1.3
 Fill and Save PDF Forms
 Change Color of Highlight, Underline and Strikeout text markups

3.1
 Released in 2014. Also named as Version 2016.  It has reached end-of-life, effective October 13, 2021. The version is no longer available in the Windows app store.

Reader for Android

10.0
The first Android edition of Adobe Reader X was released to the Android Market (now Google Play Store) on November 18, 2010. Main features include:
 Text Search
 Password Protected Documents
 Quick Jump Between Pages In Documents
 Sharing A Document
 Fit-To-Screen Viewing Mode
 PDF Portfolios
 Performance & Security Enhancements

10.1
Version 10.1 was released on October 9, 2011 with added support for Android Tablets, The new features include:
 Tablet-friendly UI
 Navigation using Bookmarks
 Text selection copy
 View comments
 Faster document open time and flips
 Smoother Pinch-Zoom experience
 Visibly less "white" as you navigate the document
 Intermediate rendering feedback for complex documents
 Support for viewing PDFs protected with Adobe LiveCycle Rights Management
 Higher Quality image rendering

10.5
Version 10.5 was released on the Google Play Store the 6 March 2013, this major update brings many new features and improvements to Reader For Android:
 Go to Page
 Night Mode
 Smart Zoom
 Screen Brightness Lock
 Undo In Freehand Annotation
 Sync last position on Acrobat.com
 Forms Central PDF Validation
 Google Cloud Print
 "Back" after clicking an internal link or bookmark

11.1

 Ability to Purchase Adobe PDF Pack and Adobe ExportPDF Services directly from Adobe Reader
 Conversion of Documents and Images in PDF with Adobe PDF Pack
 Export PDF File in Word or Excel format with Adobe ExportPDF
 New and improved search experience
 Online Help
 New and improved UI with MultiWindow support

11.2

 Support for user-added bookmarks
 Read out loud and UI navigation with accessibility mode
 Telephone hyperlinks for automatic dialing from within PDF
 Enhanced UI in document view
 Two page viewing mode for tablets

Reader for iOS

10.1
On October 9, 2011, Adobe Systems Inc. released a port of Adobe Reader X (10.1) for the Apple iOS devices, featuring an optimized UI for both for the iPhone/iPod Touch and the iPad. The iOS port was at feature parity with the Android version 10.1, the main features are:
 Text Search
 Password Protected Documents
 Sharing documents with the "Open With..." command
 Tablet friendly UI
 Navigation using Bookmarks
 Text selection copy
 Print via AirPrint Framework
 View Comments
 Faster document open time and flips
 Smoother Pinch-Zoom experience
 Visibly less "white" as you navigate the document
 Intermediate rendering feedback for complex documents
 Support for viewing PDFs protected with Adobe LiveCycle Rights Management
 Higher Quality image rendering
 Security and stability Improvements

10.5
Version 10.5 was released on the Apple Store the 9 March 2013, this major update brings many new features and improvements to Reader For iOS:
 Go to Page
 Night Mode
 Smart Zoom
 Screen Brightness Lock
 Undo In Freehand Annotation
 Sync last position on Acrobat.com
 Forms Central PDF Validation
 VoiceOver Support for Accessibility
 Bluetooth Keyboard Support for Form-Field Navigation

10.6
 Enhanced integration with Acrobat.com
 Options to flatten when Sharing files
 View notes attached to text markup
 Updated iPhone UI
 Delete and Rename files in Acrobat.com

11
 Ability to buy Adobe CreatePDF service using In app purchase
 Convert an image to PDF using Adobe's CreatePDF service
 Create PDF files from a variety of file formats using CreatePDF service
 Ability to buy Adobe ExportPDF service using in app purchase
 Export PDF files to various formats (Word, excel, etc..) for editing using ExportPDF service

11.2

 Updated UI to be iOS7 native
 Updated recent documents UI
 Improved file management
 Integrated help
 Improved accuracy of text selection
 Added monthly option for PDF Pack Subscription
 Upgraded navigation
 Fixed crashes

15.0.0
Adobe Reader is now Adobe Acrobat DC. Version 15.0.0 was released on April 7, 2015, supporting iOS 8.0 and above. The new features include:
 Easily accomplish frequent tasks from the new Tools menu
 View recent files across computers and devices with Mobile Link
 Use free Adobe Fill & Sign to fill, sign, and send forms on your iPad
 Edit text on your iPad with font matching, sizing, colors, and more
 Organize pages: reorder, rotate, and delete pages in PDF files
 Undo and redo changes including highlights, comments, and text edits
 Open files stored in your Creative Cloud account
 Sign in with support for Enterprise IDs

15.0.1
Version 15.0.1 was released on April 18, 2015, supporting iOS 8.0 and above. The new features include:
 Easily access free annotation tools! Select “Comment” from the Tool Switcher
 Find files faster. File list now defaults to Local Files
 Bug fixes

15.0.2
Version 15.0.2 was released on April 24, 2015, supporting iOS 8.0 and above. The new features include:
 Tap on My Documents to easily find files
 Access free commenting tools from the Viewer
 Enjoy performance improvements for large files
 Bug fixes

15.2
Version 15.2 was released on November 13, 2015, supporting iOS 8.0 and above. The new features include:
 Integration with Dropbox to open and save files. Connect your Dropbox account to Acrobat Reader to:
 Browse and open your Dropbox files
 Annotate, edit and sign PDF files
 Save changes back to Dropbox

15.3
Version 15.3 was released on January 5, 2016, supporting iOS 8.0 and above. The new features include:
 Sign PDFs using the new e-signature panel:
 Capture your handwritten signature via camera
 Save your e-signature to use each time you sign
 Automatically sync your e-signature to use with Adobe Acrobat Pro, Standard, or Reader on desktop
 Fixed:
 Bugs that caused lost comments and annotations
 Crashes and improved stability

15.4
Version 15.4 was released on January 23, 2016, supporting iOS 8.0 and above. The new features include:
 Improved reading experience for PDFs with bookmarks
 Changed bookmark destinations to ignore zoom settings
 Fixed:
 Intermittent crashes
 Crashes when opening certain documents
 Bug in PDF rendering where content was not visible

16.02.23
Version 16.02.23 was released on February 17, 2016, supporting iOS 8.0 and above. The new features include:
 Optimized for iPad Pro: View, annotate and sign documents on iPad Pro's expansive display.
 Added support for iOS 9 Split View and Slide Over: Multitask with two apps open side by side.
 Expanded support for Dropbox: Save files directly to Dropbox with the new “Save to…” menu item.
 Decreased app file size.
 Fixed:
 Drawing performance with Apple Pencil.
 Intermittent VoiceOver crashes.
 Issue when viewing documents containing some Asian fonts.
 Sporadic crashes when editing documents.

16.03.15
Version 16.03.15 was released on March 10, 2016, supporting iOS 8.0 and above. Features include:
 Expanded support for Dropbox: Use Create PDF and Export PDF on files stored in Dropbox. (Subscription required.)
 Improved performance when tapping on form fields and comments in certain PDFs.

16.04.05
Version 16.04.05 was released on March 30, 2016, supporting iOS 8.0 and above. Features include:
 Ability to remove individual items from Recent files list.
 Improved palm rejection to remove marks from resting your palm on the screen when using Apple Pencil with iPad Pro.
 Fixed:
 Issue with applying image-based signatures.
 Ability to share files with names containing certain symbols.
 Bug causing users to be unexpectedly signed out of Adobe Document Cloud.
 Improved stability.

16.05.17
Version 16.05.17 was released on May 4, 2016, supporting iOS 8.0 and above. The new features include:
 Fixed:
 Slow scrolling of file listings on iOS 9.3 and above.
 Bug preventing some edits to be saved to PDF.
 Ability to move, rename, and delete the correct file in filtered lists.

16.06.28
Version 16.06.28 was released on June 16, 2016, supporting iOS 9.0 and above. The new features include:
 Reflow text and images using Reading Mode:
 Display text in an easy-to-read format for smaller devices.
 Pinch or double-tap to change text size.

16.08.09
Version 16.08.09 was released on August 9, 2016, supporting iOS 9.0 and above. The new features include:
 Connect to storage providers with More Locations: Select, open, and save documents stored in iCloud Drive and other document storage providers like Box, Microsoft OneDrive, and Google Drive.
 Bug fixes.

16.09.20
Version 16.09.20 was released on September 16, 2016, supporting iOS 9.0 and above. The new features include:
 Quickly find PDFs directly from the Home screen using Spotlight Search. Touch your finger to the screen and drag down to get started.
 Compatible with iOS 10.
 Bug fixes.

16.11.01
Version 16.11.01 was released on October 26, 2016, supporting iOS 9.0 and above. The new features include:
 View opened PDF filenames in the top bar.
 Fixed:
 Issue with printing PDFs with form fields and comments.
 Ability to open files from search results.
 Bug fixes.

16.11.22
Version 16.11.22 was released on November 17, 2016, supporting iOS 9.0 and above. The new features include:
 Scan anything with your device camera:
 Snap a photo of a document, whiteboard, form, picture, receipt, or note and save it as a PDF.
 Scan multiple document pages into a single PDF and reorder as desired.
 Save and share scanned PDFs.
 Enhance your camera images with improved boundary detection, perspective correction, and text sharpness.
 Requires iPhone 5s+, iPad 3+, iPad Mini 2+, and iOS 9+.

16.12.13
Version 16.12.13 was published on December 7, 2016, supporting iOS 9.0 and above. The new features include:
 Enjoy improved performance with text markup tools.
 Easily fill and sign any form on your IPhone by connecting to the free Adobe Fill & Sign app from the Tool Switcher.
 Bug fixes.

20.013.20074
Adobe Acrobat Pro DC Version 21.007.20099 is the most current version for free download as of 21 Dec 2021.

References

Adobe software
Software version histories